Armandia is a genus of polychaetes belonging to the family Opheliidae.

The genus has cosmopolitan distribution.

Species:

Armandia agilis 
Armandia amakusaensis 
Armandia andamana 
Armandia bifida 
Armandia bilobata 
Armandia bipapillata 
Armandia brevis 
Armandia broomensis 
Armandia buccina 
Armandia casuarina 
Armandia circumpapillata 
Armandia cirrhosa 
Armandia dolio 
Armandia exigua 
Armandia filibranchia 
Armandia garretti 
Armandia hossfeldi 
Armandia ilhabelae 
Armandia intermedia 
Armandia laminosa 
Armandia lanceolata 
Armandia leptocirris 
Armandia loboi 
Armandia maculata 
Armandia mariacapae 
Armandia melanura 
Armandia nonpapillata 
Armandia opisthoculata 
Armandia paraintermedia 
Armandia parva 
Armandia polyophthalma 
Armandia salvadoriana 
Armandia sampadae 
Armandia secundariopapillata 
Armandia simodaensis 
Armandia sinaitica 
Armandia tubulata 
Armandia weissenbornii

References

Annelids